Marine All Weather Fighter Attack Squadron 224 (VMFA(AW)-224) is a United States Marine Corps F/A-18 Hornet squadron. Also known as the "Fighting Bengals", the squadron is based at Marine Corps Air Station Beaufort, South Carolina and falls under the command of Marine Aircraft Group 31 (MAG-31) and the 2nd Marine Aircraft Wing (2nd MAW). The Bengals are one of only two Marine F/A-18D Hornet Squadrons currently operating out of MCAS Beaufort, S.C. The other is the Hawks.

VMFA(AW)-224
Support the Marine Air Ground Task Force commander by providing supporting arms coordination, conducting multi-sensor imagery, and destroying surface targets and enemy aircraft day or night; under all weather conditions during expeditionary, joint, or combined operations.

History

World War II
Marine Fighter Squadron 224  (VMF-224) was commissioned on May 1, 1942 at Naval Air Station Barbers Point, Hawaii. Flying Grumman F4F Wildcats, the Bengals entered World War II as part of the Cactus Air Force stationed on Henderson Field, Guadalcanal. Led by Medal of Honor recipient Maj Robert Galer, the squadron accounted for over sixty Japanese aircraft being destroyed in less than two months. The squadron also conducted close air support (CAS) missions while under constant attack from Japanese naval, air, and ground forces. VMF-224 contributed significantly to the American victory during the Guadalcanal Campaign, which in turn, helped stem the tide of the Japanese advance across the Southern Pacific and secured a crucial foothold in the long island-hopping campaign against Japan.

After Guadalcanal, the squadron was refitted with the Vought F4U Corsair and participated in the Marshall Islands Campaign. The spring of 1945 found VMF-224 participating in the last great battle of the Pacific Campaign. During the Battle of Okinawa the squadron operated initially from Yomitan and then from 1 July from Chimu Airfield. Throughout the struggle for Okinawa, the Bengals flew infantry support and counter air missions accounting for an additional fifty-five enemy aircraft being destroyed.

1950s - 1970s
The squadron entered the jet era in 1951 with the acceptance of the McDonnell F2H-2 Banshee. In 1952, after completing a Mediterranean Cruise aboard the USS Roosevelt, the squadron accepted the Grumman F9F Panther, and was re-designated Marine Attack Squadron 224 (VMA-224).

On September 29, 1956, the squadron became the first Marine unit to field the Douglas A4D Skyhawk aircraft. In 1965, the Bengals deployed to South Vietnam as part of the United States' buildup during the Vietnam War. For nearly a year the Bengals operated their “Scooters” from the expeditionary field at Chu Lai. On November 1, 1966, the squadron acquired the Grumman A-6 Intruder and was re-designated as Marine All Weather Attack Squadron 224 (VMA(AW)-224). As part of Carrier Air Wing 15, the squadron completed six line periods on Yankee Station and participated in numerous operations including the historic Operation Pocket Money mining of Hai Phong Harbor.

The Gulf War & the 1990s

The Bengals deployed to Southwest Asia, on August 28, 1990. Operating from Shaikh-Isa Air Base, Bahrain the squadron participated in Operation Desert Shield. From January 16, to February 28, 1991, the Bengals participated in Operation Desert Storm, expending more than 2.3 million pounds of ordnance during 422 combat sorties.

Shortly after their return to Marine Corps Air Station Cherry Point, North Carolina, on May 24, 1992, the Bengals celebrated their 50th anniversary.  Less than a year later on March 5, 1993, the squadron was re-designated VMFA(AW)-224 and moved to Marine Corps Air Station Beaufort, South Carolina where the Bengals received the multi-mission F/A-18D Hornet.

From April to September 1994 the Bengals deployed to Aviano, Italy, as part of the United Nations force for Operation Deny Flight and Operation Provide Promise in Bosnia-Herzegovina. The squadron flew 1150 sorties for 3485 flight hours including 1150 night hours. The Marines of VMFA(AW)-224 again deployed to Aviano, Italy in September 1995, as part of NATO Operation Deliberate Force and Operation Joint Endeavor.

Global War on Terror
On January 11, 2005, VMFA(AW)-224 deployed to Al Asad Airbase, Iraq in support of Operation Iraqi Freedom (OIF).  While in support of OIF, the Bengals employed 65,225 lbs. of ordnance and flew over 2500 sorties and 7000 hours in direct support of Marine, Army and Coalition ground units.

On May 7, 2021, VMFA(AW)-224 deployed to Prince Sultan Air Base, Saudi Arabia for Dynamic Force Employment (DFE) in support of withdrawal of U.S. troops from Afghanistan and Operation Inherent Resolve.

Weapon system officer 2010 crash
The pilot and Weapons Systems Officer were able to safely eject.

2015 Crash
On February 22, 2015 an F/A-18D crashed in wooded and swampy terrain, near Statenville, Georgia, while conducting low-altitude tactics training. Both the pilot and weapon systems officer were able to safely eject and were treated for minor injuries.

See also

 United States Marine Corps Aviation
 List of active United States Marine Corps aircraft squadrons
 List of inactive United States Marine Corps aircraft squadrons

Notes

References

Bibliography

Web

 VMFA(AW)-224's official website

External links

 Video recounting VMFA(AW)-224's 2005 deployment to Iraq

Fighter attack squadrons of the United States Marine Corps